Walter Waldner (2 May 1929 – 3 April 2008) was an Austrian sprint canoeist who competed in the late 1950s. At the 1956 Summer Olympics in Melbourne, he finished sixth in the C-2 1000 m and  eighth in the C-2 10000 m event.

References
Walter Waldner's profile at Sports Reference.com
Mention of Walter Waldner's death (page 17) 

1929 births
2008 deaths
Austrian male canoeists
Canoeists at the 1956 Summer Olympics
Olympic canoeists of Austria